Count Karl Leopold von Schlieben (3 February 1723 – 18 April 1788) was the Royal Prussian Minister of War between 1769 and 1772.

Early life
He was born in Magdeburg. His father was Count George Adam von Schlieben (5 February 1688 – 15 June 1737) and his mother was Countess Katharina Dorothea Finck von Finckenstein.

Marriage and issue
He married Countess Marie Eleanore von Lehndorff (1723-1800) on 18 January 1747 in Königsberg. They had two daughters:
Countess Marie Karoline of Schlieben (28 January 1752 – 2 August 1832); married Count Friedrich Wilhelm von Schlieben (died in 1783) and had issue. Through their only daughter Amalie (1777-1845), she is an ancestress of the Princes of Dohna-Schlobitten and Princes of Hochberg-Pless.
Countess Friederike Amalie of Schlieben (28 February 1757 – 17 December 1827); married, on 9 March 1780 in Königsberg, Friedrich Karl Ludwig, Duke of Schleswig-Holstein-Sonderburg-Beck and had issue. Through her son, Friedrich Wilhelm, Duke of Schleswig-Holstein-Sonderburg-Glücksburg, she is an ancestress of the Royal Houses of Denmark, Greece, Norway, and the United Kingdom.
Count Karl Leopold died in Königsberg, Kingdom of Prussia.

References

1723 births
1788 deaths
Counts of Germany
Prussian nobility
Prussian politicians
Von Schlieben family